High Adventure with Lowell Thomas is an American TV series presented by Lowell Thomas. It ran on CBS from 1957 to 1959. Some episodes were made by the Australian producer Lee Robinson.

One of these was called "Australian Outback". It involved the search for the explorer Lasseter. Robinson claimed he found Lasseter's bones. He was charged with an offence by the government but charges were dropped.

Footage from this episode was later used in the 1979 documentary The Legend of Lasseter.

References

External links
 Photographs of stills from the show

1955 American television series debuts
1958 American television series endings
American travel television series
CBS original programming
English-language television shows
1950s American reality television series
1950s travel television series